{{Infobox album
| name       = Da Next Level
| type       = album
| artist     = Mr. Serv-On
| cover      = Da Next Level.jpg
| alt        =
| released   = February 16, 1999
| recorded   = 1998
| venue      =
| studio     =
| genre      = Southern Hip Hop, Gangsta Rap,East coast rap<ref>

Da Next Level is the second album by the American rapper Mr. Serv-On. It was released on February 16, 1999 as planned, through No Limit Records and Priority Records. It was  produced entirely by the label's in-house production team, Beats By the Pound. It was the rapper's last album on No Limit Records.

Commercial Performance
The album was more critically and commercially successful than the first album, debuting at number 14 on the Billboard 200 and number 1 on the Top R&B/Hip-Hop Albums. It sold nearly 300,000 copies in its first week. The album's single was "From N.Y to N.O.", featuring Big Pun.

Critical reception
The San Diego Union-Tribune wrote that "a few introspective cuts, namely 'I Hate the Way I Live', 'My Homies' and 'Best Friend II', showcase his knack for writing touching, heartfelt ballads."

Track listing
"Forever My Life: The Beginning" 1:35 
"Tank Nigga"  (Featuring C-Murder, Fiend, Kane & Abel, Lil Soldiers, Mia X, Big Ed & Mac) 4:48
"Boot 'Em Up" (Featuring Fiend & Mystikal) 3:09 
"From N.Y. To N.O." (Featuring Big Pun) 2:51
"F.U. Serv" 3:14  
"Murder" (Featuring Magic)" 4:27
"I Hate the Way I Live" 5:22 
"Best Friend II" (Featuring C-Murder & Dorian) 4:00
1, 2, 3"- (Featuring Holloway of Ghetto Commission) 2:45
"Straight Outta N.O." (Featuring C-Murder & Magic) 3:48
"Snatch Them Hoez Up" (Featuring Mia X, Fiend & T. Scott) 2:51
"My Homies" (Featuring Sons of Funk) 4:25 
"This Is for My Niggaz" (Featuring Ghetto Commission) 4:23 
"Freaky Dreams" (Featuring O'Dell) 4:04 
"Make 'Em Bleed" (Featuring Fiend)  2:15 
"Hit the Block" 2:34  
"Strap Up" (Featuring Fiend) 2:51
"I'll Be There" (Featuring Ms. Peaches) 3:38 
"My Story" (Featuring KLC) 4:20 
"I Luv It" 2:04  
"The Last Song" (Featuring O'Dell) 4:05 
"Forever My Life: The End" 1:26

Album chart positions

See also
 List of number-one R&B albums of 1999 (U.S.)

References

1999 albums
Mr. Serv-On albums
No Limit Records albums
Priority Records albums
Gangsta rap albums by American artists